The 2000 Canoe Slalom World Cup was a series of six races in 4 canoeing and kayaking categories organized by the International Canoe Federation (ICF). It was the 13th edition. The series consisted of 5 regular world cup races and the world cup final.

Calendar

Final standings 

The winner of each world cup race was awarded 30 points. The points scale reached down to 1 point for 20th place in the men's K1, while in the other three categories only the top 15 received points (with 6 points for 15th place). Only the best two results of each athlete from the first 5 world cups plus the result from the world cup final counted for the final world cup standings. Furthermore, an athlete or boat had to compete in the world cup final in order to be classified in the world cup rankings. If two or more athletes or boats were equal on points, the ranking was determined by their positions in the World Cup Final.

Results

World Cup Race 1 

The first world cup race of the season took place at the Penrith Whitewater Stadium, Australia from 29 to 30 April.

World Cup Race 2 

The second world cup race of the season took place at the Ocoee Whitewater Center, Tennessee from 17 to 18 June. The C2 event in Ocoee did not count for the world cup standings due to only 4 federations competing in the event.

World Cup Race 3 

The third world cup race of the season took place in Saint-Pé-de-Bigorre, France from 1 to 2 July.

World Cup Race 4 

The fourth world cup race of the season took place at the Segre Olympic Park in La Seu d'Urgell, Spain from 8 to 9 July.

World Cup Race 5 

The fifth world cup race of the season took place at the Prague-Troja Canoeing Centre, Czech Republic from 21 to 23 July.

World Cup Final 

The final world cup race of the season took place at the Augsburg Eiskanal, Germany from 29 to 30 July.

References

External links 
 International Canoe Federation

Canoe Slalom World Cup
Canoe Slalom World Cup